Shinkari is an area in Kohistan of the Indus Valley in the Hindu Kush mountains of  Pakistan.

Overview 

There are high schools in both government and private sectors, such as the APS (army public school). Hazara University is located some 10 km away from the town of Shinkari.

The Karakoram Highway is the main route passing through the town of Shinkari. This road leads to the capital of the Federally Administered Northern Areas at Gilgit and to China via the path of the ancient Silk Highway.

The economy of the town relies on agriculture. Tea gardens and tobacco, wheat, maize and rice are cultivated in the fertile land of Pakhal.

Hindko and the Pushto are the local languages spoken in Shinkari.

The climate is mostly pleasant and maximum temperatures during summer are 30 C and minimum temperatures in winter are -4C. There is snowfall in winter.

See also 
 Hindu Kush

References 

Populated places in Khyber Pakhtunkhwa
Regions of Pakistan